Medal for Military Merit may refer to:

 Medal of Military Merit (Greece),  a military decoration of Greece
 Medal "For Battle Merit",  a Soviet military medal
 Medal for Military Merit (Republika Srpska), a Republika Srpska medal
 Medal of Military Merit (Uruguay)
 Medal for Military Merit (Yugoslavia) ( / ), a Yugoslav medal
 Meritorious Service Medal (Belgium)

See also
 Medal of Merit (disambiguation)